Ida Mett (1901-1973) was a Belarusian Jewish anarcho-syndicalist, physician and writer. Following her experiences in the Russian Revolution, she fled into exile in France, where she collaborated with other exiled revolutionary anarchists on the Delo Truda magazine and the constitution of platformism. She then went on to participate in the anarcho-syndicalist movements in Belgium, Spain and France, before repression by the fascist Vichy regime forced her to cease her activities. She spent the final decades of her life working as a nurse and publishing history books.

Biography
Born into the predominantly Jewish town of Smarhoń, in the Pale of Settlement, Ida Markovna Gilman was exposed to radical ideas from a young age. In the wake of the Russian Revolution, she moved to the Russian capital of Moscow to study medicine and became an active participant in the Russian anarchist movement. Before she was able to complete her studies, in 1924, she was arrested on charges of anti-Soviet agitation and deported from Russia.

She fled first to Poland, then Berlin, before finally arriving in Paris, where she took the pen-name "Ida Mett" and co-edited the Russian anarchist magazine Delo Truda. Through the magazine, she began to closely collaborate with the Ukrainian anarchists Peter Arshinov and Nestor Makhno, with whom she penned The Platform. Following a conflict with Makhno over the editing of his memoirs, in 1928, she was expelled from Delo Truda for her religious practices, after she lit a yahrzeit candle for her recently-deceased father. 

During this time, she had also met the Belgian libertarian Nicolas Lazarévitch, who became her husband and her co-editor at the French anarcho-syndicalist newspaper La Liberation Syndicale. Together they organised a series of anti-Bolshevik campaigns, following which they were expelled from France. The couple moved to Belgium, where she resumed her studies in medicine and finally graduated with a diploma, although she would be banned from practising medicine in both Belgium and France, due to her anarchist activities.

It was at this time that she met Buenaventura Durruti and Francisco Ascaso, who invited her to Catalonia following the proclamation of the Spanish Republic. In Barcelona, Mett participated in the local anarcho-syndicalist movement, observing the outbreak of the Spanish Revolution of 1936, during which she provided medical aid to anarchist militiamen. 

Mett and her husband then returned clandestinely to France, living as illegal immigrants in Le Pré-Saint-Gervais until their arrest and imprisonment during the Battle of France in 1940. The French State moved Mett and her young son to the Rieucros Camp, where they were detained for a year, until their release was secured by the French Trotskyist Boris Souvarine. After their attempts to leave for the United States were blocked by the authorities, Mett and her family moved to La Garde-Freinet, where they remained under constant surveillance.

Following the end of World War II, Mett returned to work as a nurse at a Jewish children's hospital in Brunoy. During this time, she published a series of history books about the Kronstadt rebellion, the Russian Revolution and the Soviet Union. She and her husband later participated in the events of May 68, passing down the stories of their experiences to the next generation.

Ida Mett died in Paris on 27 June 1973, at the age of 71.

Publications
 The Kronstadt Commune (1948)
 Medicine in the USSR (1953)
 The Soviet School (1954)
 The Russian Peasant in the Revolution and Post-Revolution (1968)

Sources

Further reading

External links
Ida Mett Archive Library at RevoltLib.com
Ida Mett Archive Library at TheAnarchistLibrary.com

1901 births
1973 deaths
20th-century Belarusian historians
20th-century Belarusian Jews
20th-century Belarusian writers
20th-century Belarusian women politicians
20th-century Belarusian politicians
20th-century women writers
Anarchist writers
Anarcho-syndicalists
Belarusian anarchists
Belarusian Jews
Belarusian physicians
Belarusian prisoners and detainees
Belarusian women activists
Belarusian women writers
French-language writers
Jewish anarchists
Jewish Belarusian politicians
Jewish historians
Jewish prisoners and detainees
People deported from Russia
People from Oshmyansky Uyezd
People from Smarhon’
Prisoners and detainees of Vichy France
Russian-language writers
Soviet emigrants to France
Soviet people of the Spanish Civil War
Soviet women historians
World War II civilian prisoners